The Mosque of Islamic Solidarity is a mosque located in Mogadishu, Somalia.

History
The Mosque of Islamic Solidarity was constructed in 1987 by Hamar Construction company with financial support from the Saudi Fahd bin Abdul Aziz Al Saud Foundation. It is the main mosque in Somalia's capital city, and an iconic building in Somali society.

Following the start of the civil war in the early 1990s, the masjid closed down. It was later reopened in 2006 by the Islamic Courts Union, which began raising funds from the business community for intended renovations of parts of the building. In 2015, the Federal Government of Somalia completed formal refurbishments on the mosque's infrastructure.

Capacity and location
The Mosque of Islamic Solidarity is the single largest masjid in the Horn of Africa. It is capable of accommodating up to 10,000 worshippers. The masjid also overlooks the Somali Sea.

Renovations
In 2012–2013, the mosque was renovated and rehabilitated by the Starsom Group, a local Somali contractor, under the funding of Turkiye Diyanet Foundation, a non-profit, non-governmental Turkish organization.

See also
  Lists of mosques 
  List of mosques in Africa
  List of mosques in Egypt
Arba'a Rukun Mosque
Fakr ad-Din Mosque
Masjid al-Qiblatayn

References

1987 establishments in Somalia
Buildings and structures in Mogadishu
Islamic Solidarity
Islamic Solidarity